Spilosoma bipartita is a moth in the family Erebidae. It was described by Walter Rothschild in 1933. It is found in Angola, Congo, Kenya, Malawi, South Africa, Tanzania and Zimbabwe.

References

Spilosoma bipartita at Markku Savela's Lepidoptera and Some Other Life Forms

Moths described in 1933
bipartita